Pollawut Kwasenai (born March 7, 1988), formerly Pollawut Donjui is a Thai professional footballer who plays as a left winger. He won the Thailand Premier League in 2008.

Honours

Club
PEA
 Thai Premier League (1): 2008

External links

1988 births
Living people
Pollawut Kwasena
Pollawut Kwasena
Association football wingers
Pollawut Kwasena
Pollawut Kwasena
Pollawut Kwasena
Pollawut Kwasena
Pollawut Kwasena
Pollawut Kwasena